The penny is a coin used in several English-speaking countries. 

Penny or pennies may also refer to:

People
 Penny (surname)
 Penny (given name)
 Penny (nickname)
 Penny Banner, ring name of American professional wrestler Mary Ann Kostecki (1934–2008)
 Penny Rimbaud, English writer and performance artist Jeremy John Ratter (born 1943)

Arts and entertainment

Books and publishing 
 Penny Magazine, a British weekly published from 1832 to 1845
 Penny Publications, an American magazine publisher
 The Penny, a 2007 novel by Joyce Meyer and Deborah Bedford

Fictional characters 
 The title character of Penny (comic strip)
 Penny (The Big Bang Theory), a sitcom character
 Penny (The Rescuers), an animated Disney film character
 Penny, in the animated Disney film Bolt
 Penny, from Dr. Horrible's Sing-Along Blog, an Internet mini-series
 Penny, in the animated TV series Inspector Gadget
 Penny, the title character of a recurring cartoon segment of the show Pee-wee's Playhouse
 Penny, in the animated Nickelodeon show The Mighty B!
 Penny, the female counterpart to Tux the Penguin in Linux computer games
 William "Penny" Adiyodi, in the American TV series The Magicians
 Penny Crygor, a WarioWare character
 Penny Fitzgerald, in the animated TV series The Amazing World of Gumball
 Penny Halliwell, from the TV series Charmed
 Penny Hartz, on the sitcom Happy Endings
 Penny Haywood, from the mobile game Harry Potter: Hogwarts Mystery
 Penny Lane, from the movie Almost Famous
 Penny Ling, a panda in the children's cartoon TV series Littlest Pet Shop
 Penny Morris, the female firefighter from the children's animated TV series Fireman Sam
 Penny Peterson, in the 2014 film Mr. Peabody & Sherman
 Penny Pingleton, in the 1988 film Hairspray and subsequent adaptations
 Penny Polendina, from the 2013 Rooster Teeth series RWBY
 Penny Proud, from the American animated TV series The Proud Family
 Penny Robinson (Lost in Space), a TV and movie character
 Penny Rourke, in the New Zealand soap opera Shortland Street
 Penny Sanchez, in the animated TV series ChalkZone
 Penny Scavo, in the TV series Desperate Housewives
 Penny Valentine (Holby City), a TV medical drama series character
 Penny Widmore, on the TV series Lost

Music 
 Penny (rapper) (born c. 1981)
 Penny (album), 1977 album by Penny McLean
 "Pennies", a song by The Cool Kids
 "Pennies", a song on the Smashing Pumpkins EP Zero
 "Pennies", a song by Die Monster Die from Withdrawal Method
 "Penny", a song by Night Ranger from Dawn Patrol
 "Penny", a song from the film Sarkaru Vaari Paata

Places
 Penny, Calloway County, Kentucky, an unincorporated community in the United States
 Penny, Pike County, Kentucky, an unincorporated community in the United States
 Penny, British Columbia, a community in Canada
 Penny Ice Cap, Baffin Island, Canada
 Penny's Bay, Hong Kong

Other uses 
 Pennies (charity box), a UK micro-donation scheme
Penny (supermarket), a German chain
 Penny (unit), a unit of nail size

See also 
 
 
 
 Pennyweight, a unit of mass
 Penney, surname
 Penney (disambiguation)
 Penni (disambiguation)
 Pence (disambiguation)
 Pennie (soccer), a type of jersey